Jach'a Sirk'i (Aymara jach'a big, sirk'i wart, "big wart", hispanicized spelling Jachasirque) is a mountain in the Andes of Peru, about  high. It is located in the Cusco Region, Canchis Province, Checacupe District. Jach'a Sirk'i lies northwest of Wari Sallani.

References

Mountains of Peru
Mountains of Cusco Region